General William Martin Cafe VC (26 March 1826 – 6 August 1906) was an English recipient of the Victoria Cross, the highest and most prestigious award for gallantry in the face of the enemy that can be awarded to British and Commonwealth forces.

Victoria Cross details
Cafe was 32 years old, and a captain in the 56th Bengal Native Infantry, Indian Army during  the Indian Mutiny when the following deed took place for which he was awarded the VC. On 15 April 1858, during the attack on Fort Ruhya, India, Captain Cafe, with other volunteers (Edward Spence and Alexander Thompson) carried away the body of a lieutenant of the 14th Punjab Rifles from the top of the glacis in a most exposed position under very heavy fire.  He then went to the rescue of one of the privates who had been severely wounded.
His citation in the London Gazette reads:

His Victoria Cross is held by the National Army Museum at Chelsea, London.

Later career
He later achieved the rank of General. Cafe is buried in Brompton Cemetery, London, with his wife Isabella Mary.

References

Publications
Monuments to Courage (David Harvey, 1999)
The Register of the Victoria Cross (This England, 1997)
Scotland's Forgotten Valour (Graham Ross, 1995)

External links
Location of grave and VC medal (Brompton Cemetery)

British recipients of the Victoria Cross
Indian Rebellion of 1857 recipients of the Victoria Cross
British Indian Army generals
British East India Company Army officers
Military personnel from London
1826 births
1906 deaths
Burials at Brompton Cemetery
British military personnel of the Second Anglo-Sikh War
20th-century British people